The Ottawa Rebel was a team in the National Lacrosse League based in Ottawa, Ontario from 2001 until 2003. They initially played at the Corel Centre (now called the Canadian Tire Centre), but part-way through the 2002 season moved to the smaller, but centrally located, Ottawa Civic Centre. From 1997 until 2000 the team was located in Syracuse, New York and was called the Syracuse Smash.

The Rebel was owned by the Brad Watters group which also brought lacrosse to Toronto and Montreal.

In their first season in Ottawa the Rebel had one win and thirteen losses and finished last of nine teams. Their second season was slightly better, with four wins and twelve losses, but due to tie breakers they finished fourth in the Northern Division and thirteenth overall behind the Calgary Roughnecks, who also finished with a 4-12 record. In their third and final year in Ottawa they again had four wins and twelve losses, placing them fourth in the Northern Division again but tenth out of twelve in the overall league standings.

As the Syracuse Smash they were last overall all three years prompting the move to the Canadian capital.

The franchise became inactive after the 2003 season. In 2005, it was purchased by Bruce Urban and moved to Edmonton, Alberta, becoming the Edmonton Rush.

All time Record

2000-01 schedule

2001-02 schedule

2002-03 schedule

References

Defunct National Lacrosse League teams
Reb
Lacrosse clubs established in 2001
Lacrosse clubs disestablished in 2003
2001 establishments in Ontario
2003 disestablishments in Ontario